Pullabrook Halt was a railway station opened in 1931 by the Great Western Railway to serve the hamlet of Pullabrook that lies between Bovey Tracey and Lustleigh in West Devon, England. Opened as Hawkmoor Halt after Hawkmoor Hospital, originally known as Hawkmoor County Sanatorium, a specialist hospital founded in 1913 as a pulmonary tuberculosis sanatorium. It was renamed Pullabrook Halt by the British Railways in 1955, a few years before closure.

The halt was opened at a later date than most of the stations on the line which had itself opened in 1876. The single platform's construction was of infill behind railway sleepers. The track was single with no passing loop or sidings.

References
Notes

Sources
 Butt, R. V. J. (1995). The Directory of Railway Stations: details every public and private passenger station, halt, platform and stopping place, past and present (1st ed.). Sparkford: Patrick Stephens Ltd. . OCLC 60251199.

Railway stations in Great Britain opened in 1931
Disused railway stations in Devon
Former Great Western Railway stations
Railway stations in Great Britain closed in 1959